Dayna Vawdrey (born 17 January 1982), is a New Zealand television presenter and radio announcer perhaps best known for her role co-hosting Studio 2.

Early life
Vawdrey was born in Auckland of British (mother) and Samoan (father) descent. As a child she landed a role in a TV commercial.

Career
Vawdrey's career really began when she secured a presenting role on Juice TV in 2003. In 2004 she was poached by TVNZ to co-host TV2's children's TV show, Studio 2. When the series ended in 2010, Vawdrey worked as a radio announcer for Rhema Media. In 2011 Vawdrey presented Operation Hero on TV2. Vawdrey has also MC'd and presented for various corporate and charity clients such as Air New Zealand and World Vision.

In 2018 Vawdrey won Best Children's Programme at the New Zealand Radio Awards and was a Bronze Radio Winner for Best Children/Young Adult Program at the New York Festivals World's Best Radio Programs for her role as a presenter on a Christmas morning children's programme on Newstalk ZB.

Personal life
Dayna married Callum Galloway in 2014 and the couple have one son, Luca, born in 2017.

See also
 List of New Zealand television personalities

References

External links

1982 births
Living people
New Zealand television presenters
New Zealand women television presenters
New Zealand radio presenters
New Zealand women radio presenters